Ivu or IVU may refer to:
 Ice shove, a surge of ice from large bodies of water onto the shore
 International Vegetarian Union, a non-profit organisation
 Intravenous urogram
 Puerto Rico Sales and Use Tax
 Ivu or Eve, a character from the manga Black Cat